Dirfys is a former municipality in Euboea, Greece, named after Mount Dirfys. Since the 2011 local government reform it is part of the municipality Dirfys-Messapia, of which it is a municipal unit. The municipal unit has an area of 344.16 km2. Population 5,473 (2011). The seat of the municipality was in Steni.

International relations

Dirfys is twinned with:
  Alatri in Italy

References

Populated places in Euboea